Rivers with Griff Rhys Jones is a British documentary television series broadcast on BBC One in 2009. In this five-part series Griff, joined by his dog Cadbury, explores some of Britain's most well known rivers. It was created by Rhys Jones own production company Modern Television. Rivers was the top programme in its slot in terms of viewing figures reaching 4.7 million viewers. The programme was featured on the cover of the Radio Times.

Episode list

References

External links
 

2009 British television series debuts
2009 British television series endings
BBC television documentaries about history
British travel television series
BBC high definition shows
English-language television shows